Slanské Nové Mesto is a village and municipality in Košice-okolie District in the Kosice Region of eastern Slovakia.

History
In historical records the village was first mentioned in 1332 (Vyuarus, Wywaros) as a royal city “ cives et hospites de Nova Civitate regale”.  In 1387 it belonged to Slanec. In 1427 it belonged to noble family Lossonczy.

Geography
The village lies at an altitude of 240 metres and covers an area of 30.116 km².
It has a population of about 480 people.

Ethnicity
The population is entirely Slovak in ethnicity.

Culture
The village has a small public library and several stores including food facilities.

Transport
The village is connected via railway at the nearest station in Kalsa.

External links

Villages and municipalities in Košice-okolie District